Asan United was a South Korean football club based in the city of Asan. It was a founder member of the Challengers League, an amateur league and the third tier of league football in South Korea in 2007. The club was dissolved in 2015 after merging with Cheonan FC.

The club was founded in 2005 as Asan FC. In December 2007, the name of the club was changed to Asan United FC. In March 2009, club's name was changed to Asan Citizen FC. After the 2011 season, the club was relocated to Yesan County nearby Asan and changed the name. In the 2013 season, the club re-changed name to Asan United FC.

Season-by-season records

See also
 List of football clubs in South Korea

K3 League (2007–2019) clubs
Sport in South Chungcheong Province
Asan
Association football clubs established in 2005
Association football clubs disestablished in 2015
2005 establishments in South Korea
2015 disestablishments in South Korea